Denver School of the Arts (DSA) is a comprehensive, public, arts magnet school, serving grades 6–12. Located at 7111 Montview Boulevard in the Park Hill neighborhood of Denver, Colorado, the school is operated by the Denver Public School District.

DSA currently offers 11 art majors – bands, creative writing, dance & movement, guitar, orchestra, piano, stagecraft & design, theatre, video cinema arts, visual arts, and vocal music.

History
Denver School of the Arts began as a concurrent program at Manual High School in the late 1980s, but was eventually transformed into a fully staffed school on the campus of the former Byers Middle School at 150 South Pearl Street – the former site of Byers Mansion.

During the 2003–2004 school year, DSA moved to its current location at 7111 E. Montview Boulevard, the former site of the W. Dale and W. Ida Houston Fine Arts Center built by the Colorado Women's College and later used by the Lamont School of Music.

Students
DSA serves both middle school and high school students. Graduating class sizes are small, with approximately 140 students comprising the Class of 2018.

Audition process
DSA requires an audition for prospective students competing to join one of its eleven offered majors.

Extracurricular activities

Majors
DSA offers majors in Guitar, Vocal Music, Piano, Creative Writing, Video Cinema Arts, Stagecraft and Design, Dance, Visual Arts, Band, Orchestra, and Theatre. All majors are chosen at 6th grade except for Stagecraft and Design, which is only offered for 9th grade and above. Students may switch their major by going through that major's audition process, but a spot in that major is not guaranteed.

Sports
Denver School of the Arts does not offer its own extracurricular sports programs, nor does it offer in-school physical education. DSA students are encouraged to participate in sports programs at other Denver high schools and middle schools. Many students at DSA play sports at the sister school of East High School or at their "home" high school.

Notable alumni
 Peter Atencio - director, Key & Peele, Comedy Central; director, Keanu; winner, Peabody Award
Gabriel Ebert - stage actor, Matilda the Musical; screen actor, Ricki and the Flash, Mr. Mercedes; winner, Tony Award for Best Featured Actor in a Musical
Mondo Guerra - fashion designer, winner, Project Runway: All Stars (2012)
Justine Lupe - screen actor, Mr. Mercedes, Cristela, Harry's Law
Jovan Bridges (“Yvie Oddly”) - performer, winner, RuPaul’s Drag Race (2019)

References

External links
 

Public middle schools in Colorado
Schools in Denver
High schools in Denver
Educational institutions established in 1991
Public high schools in Colorado
Magnet schools in Colorado
1991 establishments in Colorado